The Jesuit Block and Estancias of Córdoba are a former Jesuit reduction built by missionaries in the  province of Córdoba, Argentina, named a World Heritage Site in 2000.

The Manzana Jesuítica contains the University of Córdoba, one of the oldest in South America, the Monserrat Secondary School, a church, and residence buildings. To maintain such a project, the Jesuits operated six Estancias (residences) around the province of Córdoba, named Caroya, Jesús María, Santa Catalina, Alta Gracia, Candelaria, and San Ignacio.

The farm and the complex, started in 1615, had to be left by the Jesuits, following the 1767 decree by King Charles III of Spain that expelled them from the continent. They were then run by the Franciscans until 1853, when the Jesuits returned to The Americas. Nevertheless, the university and the high-school were nationalized a year later.

Each Estancia has its own church and set of  buildings, around which towns grew, such as Alta Gracia, the closest to the Block.

Jorge Mario Bergoglio, who would later become Pope Francis, lived there.

See also
 List of Jesuit sites

References

External links
Jesuit Block and Estancias of Córdoba - Argentine Tourism Office
Estancias Jesuíticas 
Images of the Estancias - Government of Córdoba 
Jesuitic institutions in Argentina

Buildings and structures completed in the 17th century
World Heritage Sites in Argentina
Buildings and structures in Córdoba Province, Argentina
Jesuit history in South America
Spanish missions in Argentina
Former populated places in Argentina
Tourist attractions in Córdoba Province, Argentina
1615 establishments in the Spanish Empire